The Eurovision Song Contest 2020 was planned to be the 65th edition of the Eurovision Song Contest. The contest was cancelled on 18 March 2020 due to the COVID-19 pandemic, making the first time in the contest's 64-year history that an edition was not held.

The contest was scheduled to be held at Rotterdam Ahoy and would consist of two semi-finals on 12 and 14 May, and a final on 16 May 2020. Forty-one countries would have participated in the contest;  and  would have returned after their absence from the 2019 contest, while  and  had confirmed their non-participation after taking part in the previous edition. All 41 competing artists and songs were confirmed by the relevant broadcasters by early March 2020.

In place of the cancelled contest, the EBU and its Dutch members NPO, NOS and AVROTROS organised a replacement show, Eurovision: Europe Shine a Light, to showcase the selected entries on 16 May, the day of the planned final. Rotterdam remained host of the 2021 contest on 18, 20 and 22 May 2021; however, the songs selected for the 2020 contest were not eligible for the competition.

Location 

The 2020 contest was to be held at Rotterdam Ahoy in Rotterdam, the Netherlands, following the country's victory at the 2019 edition with the song "Arcade", performed by Duncan Laurence. Rotterdam Ahoy had previously hosted the Junior Eurovision Song Contest 2007.

Preparations 
Preparations for the 2020 contest began on 19 May 2019, immediately after the Netherlands won the 2019 contest in Tel Aviv, Israel. Jon Ola Sand, the executive supervisor of the contest on behalf of the European Broadcasting Union (EBU), handed AVROTROS, the Dutch participating broadcaster, a stack of documents and a USB drive with tools to begin the work needed to host the next contest. AVROTROS was co-organising the event with sister broadcaster  (NOS) and their parent public broadcasting organisation,  (NPO).

Bidding phase 

Already prior to the 2019 contest, when bookmakers expected Duncan Laurence to win, several Dutch cities, including Amsterdam, The Hague and Maastricht, announced their intent to host the contest should the Netherlands win. A spokesperson for NPO also stated that the broadcaster had a rough plan for how they would select the host city in the event of a Dutch victory. When Laurence won the contest, mayors of various municipalities immediately began lobbying Mark Rutte, the Prime Minister of the Netherlands, through text messages. Public figures, including Laurence, Esther Hart, Getty Kaspers and André Rieu, voiced their support for their respective favourite host cities.

The hosting broadcasters launched the bidding process on 29 May 2019. In the first phase of this process, cities were to formally apply to bid. Nine cities—Amsterdam, Arnhem, Breda, 's-Hertogenbosch, The Hague, Leeuwarden, Maastricht, Rotterdam, and Utrecht—did so and received a list of criteria they and their venues needed to meet on 12 June 2019. Initially, Zwolle had also considered launching a bid to host the event but the city ultimately decided against doing so because it deemed its venue, the IJsselhallen, to have unsuitable proportions. Enschede could have been a potential host city as Enschede Airport Twente considered bidding to host the event in its eleventh hangar, however, it later learned that Enschede's municipality executive board had decided against financially supporting such a bid.

From this point on, these nine cities had until 10 July 2019 to compile their bid books to demonstrate their capabilities to host the contest. Further cities were still able to join in on the bidding race by applying prior to the deadline. During this period, four cities withdrew. Amsterdam could not host the contest because it was preoccupied with hosting other events during the contest's time frame. Breda dropped out due to financial concerns. Leeuwarden ceased bidding due to the insufficient height of the ceiling of its WTC Expo. The Hague dropped its bid because both of its potential venues were unsuitable for the event. The local Cars Jeans Stadion football stadium would have been large enough but lacked a roof, and installing such a roof would have made the bid financially unviable. Its other option would have been spanning a tent over the Malieveld field, but after reviewing the hosting conditions, this option fell out of favour. Following its withdrawal, The Hague turned to support Rotterdam's bid instead.

The five remaining cities—Arnhem, 's-Hertogenbosch, Maastricht, Rotterdam, and Utrecht—delivered their finished bid books to a ceremonial event held in Hilversum on 10 July 2019. The hosting broadcasters reviewed the bids presented and on 16 July 2019 announced that it eliminated those for Arnhem, 's-Hertogenbosch and Utrecht, shortlisting only Maastricht and Rotterdam. Utrecht was specifically eliminated because its proposal to span a tent over its Jaarbeurs offered limited possibilities for testing on location and had a questionable suitability for events like the Eurovision Song Contest, while 's-Hertogenbosch was dropped due to an insufficient ceiling height in its Brabanthallen and too few hotel rooms blocked for potential visitors of the contest.

To review and discuss the location, venue and surrounding events for the remaining bids, NPO visited Maastricht on 17 July 2019 and Rotterdam on the following day. By late July, additional visits to the two shortlisted cities were deemed necessary to review production logistics. The EBU did not pay visits to either city. Maastricht and Rotterdam were to hand in revised versions of their bid books by 9 August 2019 to add details involving the cities' social programmes, side-events and programme licensing. A "concept agreement" was put before the organisers in both Maastricht and Rotterdam in August 2019. While Rotterdam signed this agreement, the city council of Maastricht discussed and rejected it. Within the same council session, it was also clarified that the MECC would not receive additional renovations. On 30 August, Rotterdam was announced as the host city during a special broadcast on NPO 1 and NPO 2.

Key:
 Host venue
 Shortlisted venues

Other sites 

The Eurovision Village would have been erected to serve as the official Eurovision Song Contest fan and sponsors' area during the events week. There, it would have been possible to watch performances by local artists, as well as the live shows broadcast from the main venue. The Binnenrotte was the planned location for the Village. The Binnenrotte is one of the largest open spaces in the centre of Rotterdam. It is located in the heart of the city, next to some of Rotterdam's most famous architectural marvels, such as the Markthal.

The EuroClub would have been the venue for the official after-parties and private performances by contest participants. Unlike the Eurovision Village, access to the EuroClub would be restricted to accredited fans, delegates, and press. It would have been located at the Maassilo. Maassilo is located on Rotterdam's waterfront at Maashaven Zuidzijde, a 10-minute drive from Rotterdam Ahoy.

The "Golden Carpet" and Opening Ceremony events, where the contestants and their delegations present themselves in front of the accredited press and fans, would have taken place at the Rotterdam Cruise Terminal on 10 May 2020.

Production 
The Eurovision Song Contest 2020 would have been a co-production between three related Dutch television organisations —  (NPO),  (NOS) and AVROTROS — of which each assumed a different role. Sietse Bakker and Inge van de Weerd would have served as executive producers, while Emilie Sickinghe and Jessica Stam would have served as deputy executive producers. In August 2019, Marnix Kaart and Marc Pos were announced as the directors of the three live shows, as well as Gerben Bakker as head of show. Cornald Maas would have been creative advisor. Jon Ola Sand, executive supervisor of the contest, would keep his role as he had done since 2011, though he planned to step down following the 2020 contest.

Visual design 
The contest's slogan, "Open Up", was unveiled on 24 October 2019. The official logo and branding was unveiled on 28 November 2019. Designed by Clever°Franke, it is "an abstract representation of the flag colours of the 41 countries participating in 2020 by first appearance to the contest".

Presenters

Beauty vlogger Nikkie de Jager (NikkieTutorials) would have been the presenter of the contest's online content, including a behind-the-scenes YouTube series to be recorded with the participating artists. She would have also reported from the "Golden Carpet" during the opening ceremony and was scheduled to make an appearance in all three live shows. Roos Moggré and  would have moderated the contest's press conferences.

Stage design
The stage design for the 2020 contest was revealed on 2 December 2019. The design was inspired by the slogan "Open Up" and the typical Dutch flat landscape. The Eurovision stage was designed by German stage designer , who also designed the stages for the contests in 2011–12, 2015, and 2017–19. Unlike the previous contest, the green room was placed inside the main performance venue.

Opening and interval acts 
The second semi-final would have opened with a performance by breakdancer Redo. The final would have been opened with the traditional flag parade, introducing all twenty-six finalists, accompanied by music produced by 15-year-old DJ Pieter Gabriel. A symphony orchestra of sixty-five young musicians from across the Netherlands, specifically formed for this occasion, was scheduled to perform in the final, together with DJ Afrojack and singer Glennis Grace, the latter of whom represented the Netherlands in the 2005 contest. This interval act would have also featured forty dancers and a twenty-five-piece gospel choir.

Furthermore, the final was scheduled to include performances from eight former Eurovision winners: Gigliola Cinquetti would have performed "", Lenny Kuhr would have performed "", Getty Kaspers (of Teach-In) would have performed "Ding-a-dong", Sandra Kim would have performed "", Paul Harrington and Charlie McGettigan would have performed "Rock 'n' Roll Kids", Alexander Rybak would have performed "Fairytale", and Duncan Laurence would have performed "Arcade" once again.

Format

Voting system 
The Spanish Head of Delegation revealed on 22 October 2019 that the EBU was consulting with delegations on potential changes to the voting system. The Greek Head of Delegation revealed on 30 October 2019 that the majority of delegations (80%) voted in favour of maintaining the current voting system.

Semi-final allocation draw 
The draw to determine the participating countries' semi-finals took place on 28 January 2020 at 16:10 CET, at the Rotterdam City Hall. The thirty-five semi-finalists were divided over five pots, based on historical voting patterns as calculated by the contest's official televoting partner Digame. The purpose of drawing from different pots was to reduce the chance of "bloc voting" and to increase suspense in the semi-finals. The draw also determined which semi-final each of the six automatic qualifiers – host country the Netherlands and "Big Five" countries France, Germany, Italy, Spain and the United Kingdom – would broadcast and vote in. The ceremony was hosted by contest presenters Chantal Janzen, Jan Smit and Edsilia Rombley, and included the passing of the host city insignia from Zippi Brand Frank, deputy mayor of Tel Aviv (host city of the previous contest) to Ahmed Aboutaleb, mayor of Rotterdam.

Postcards 
The concept of the 2020 postcards was based on the "Open Up" theme of the contest. Each artist would have visited a different part of the Netherlands and connected with locals by participating in a Dutch activity, tradition or hobby.

Countries set to participate 

The EBU announced on 13 November 2019 that forty-one countries would participate in the contest, with Bulgaria and Ukraine returning after their absence from the 2019 contest, with Hungary and Montenegro withdrawing mostly due to financial reasons. Following the cancellation of the contest, artists who would have participated in this edition may be chosen to participate in the following year, but they have to enter with new songs in accordance to the Eurovision rules.

Artists which would have returned
Three artists which had previously competed as lead vocalists for the same countries had been selected to compete again.

A number of other acts had previously performed as backing vocalists in other years, but had been selected as the lead artist for the 2020 contest.

Semi-final 1
The first semi-final would have taken place on 12 May 2020 at 21:00 (CEST). Seventeen countries would have participated in the first semi-final.

Semi-final 2
The second semi-final would have taken place on 14 May 2020 at 21:00 (CEST). Eighteen countries would have participated in the second semi-final.

Final 
The final would have taken place on 16 May 2020 at 21:00 (CEST). Twenty-six countries would have participated in the final, composed of the host country, the "Big Five", and the ten best-ranked entries of each of the two semi-finals. All forty-one participating countries would have voted in the final.

Other countries 

Eligibility for potential participation in the Eurovision Song Contest requires a national broadcaster with active EBU membership that will be able to broadcast the contest via the Eurovision network. The EBU issued an invitation of participation in the contest to all active members. In contrast to previous years, associate member  did not need an invitation for the 2020 contest, as it had previously been granted permission to participate at least until 2023.

Active EBU members 
  – In March 2019, Andorran broadcaster Ràdio i Televisió d'Andorra (RTVA) stated that they would be open to co-operating with Catalan broadcaster Televisió de Catalunya (TVC) to participate in future contests. In May 2019, RTVA confirmed that they would not participate in the 2020 contest. In November 2019, the ruling party of Andorra (Democrats for Andorra) stated that RTVA would eventually return to the contest, with a cost assessment being a prerequisite.
  – In December 2018, Lejla Babović, an executive with Radio and Television of Bosnia and Herzegovina (BHRT), stated that returning to the contest was BHRT's primary goal, but also that their financial situation made it difficult to return to the contest in 2020. In July 2019, BHRT confirmed that they could not return due to sanctions imposed by the EBU as a result of the broadcaster's outstanding debt with the organisation.
  – In October 2019, Hungarian broadcaster MTVA stated, that A Dal, which had been used as the national selection process since 2012, would not be used to select Hungary's entry to the 2020 contest, and instead of focusing on Eurovision, the creators of A Dal wanted to focus more on supporting the Hungarian pop scene. Hungary's absence was confirmed with the release of the full list of participants by the EBU. The non-participation came during a rise of anti-LGBTQ+ sentiment among the leadership of Hungary and MTVA; while no official reason for the non-participation was given by the broadcaster, an inside source speaking with the website Index.hu stated that the contest was considered "too gay" for MTVA to participate. This was later denied by MTVA.
  – Because Luxembourg had not participated in the competition since , there were increasing calls on them to return to the contest by 2019. In May 2019, Anne-Marie David, who won the  contest for Luxembourg, called on the nation to return, while a petition from fans demanding a Luxembourgish return to the contest was sent to the Luxembourgish broadcaster RTL Télé Lëtzebuerg (RTL) and the Chamber of Deputies of Luxembourg. In previous years, RTL had stated they would not return to the contest due to financial concerns and the belief that smaller nations could not succeed in modern Eurovision events. In June 2019, the Chamber of Deputies opened a petition of its own, which accepted signatures through 1 August 2019. In July 2019, the broadcaster stated that they would not participate in the 2020 contest because the contest would be a financial strain on the broadcaster and because they focused on news content instead of music and entertainment.
  – Monégasque broadcaster TMC confirmed in August 2019 that it would not take part in the 2020 contest.
  – Montenegrin broadcaster RTCG confirmed its preliminary participation in September 2019. However, the broadcaster informed website ESCToday in November that its participation in the 2020 contest would not be possible. RTCG's director general, Božidar Šundić, challenged this statement, stating that a decision on the participation had yet to be made by RTCG's council. Montenegro did not appear on the final list of participants, and RTCG later stated that they had decided not to participate due to "modest results" and financial issues. The money that would have otherwise been used for the contest participation fee was instead allocated to purchasing new cars to be used by RTCG staff. Montenegro's non-participation was confirmed with the release of the full list of participants by the EBU.
  – In June 2019, Slovak broadcaster Radio and Television of Slovakia (RTVS) announced that it would not participate in the 2020 contest due to a lack of interest from the Slovak public.
  – In September 2019, the EBU stated that Turkish Radio and Television Corporation (TRT) had not signed up to compete in the 2020 contest. Turkey last took part in 2012.

Associate EBU members 
  – In November 2018, Jon Ola Sand, the executive supervisor of the contest, stated that Kazakhstan's participation in the contest needed to be discussed by the contest's reference group. Kazakhstan, through its EBU associate member Khabar Agency, had previously been invited to participate in the Junior Eurovision Song Contest by that contest's reference group, though that would not affect their participation in the main contest. The EBU stated in September 2019 that they had no intention to invite Kazakhstan to the 2020 contest.

Non-EBU members 
  – In June 2018, Mentor Shala, the then-general director of Kosovan broadcaster Radio Television of Kosovo (RTK), stated that the broadcaster was still pushing for full EBU membership and that it hoped to debut at the 2020 contest. In June 2019, at the EBU's 82nd General Assembly, members of the EBU voted against the abolishing of an International Telecommunication Union (ITU) membership as a requirement to join the EBU, thus RTK cannot join the EBU in time for the 2020 contest.
  – In August 2019, Liechtensteiner broadcaster 1 FL TV announced that they had ruled out debuting in the 2020 contest. The broadcaster had attempted to become an EBU member in the past but halted its plans when its director, Peter Kölbel, unexpectedly died. It would also need the backing of the Liechtenstein government to be able to carry the cost of becoming an EBU member and paying the participation fee for the contest.

Planned broadcasts 

Before the contest's cancellation, countries had started confirming their broadcasting plans and who would provide commentary either on-location or remotely at the broadcaster during the contest. The role of the commentators was to add insight to the participating entries and the provision of voting information.

Impacts of the COVID-19 pandemic and cancellation 

In January–February 2020, the spread of the coronavirus disease 2019 (known as COVID-19) from Wuhan, China to other countries around the world raised concerns and the potential impact over staging the Eurovision Song Contest. On 6 March, the Dutch broadcaster NPO stated: "Eurovision organisers would follow the advice of health authorities in deciding what form the event, due to be held on 12–16 May, would take." In March, authorities in Denmark urged the cancellation of events with more than 1,000 spectators to limit the spread of the virus. This resulted in the  being held with no live audience. Representatives from Sweden, Finland, Israel, Switzerland, Italy and Greece attended the Heads of Delegation meeting on 9 March remotely. The contest's executive supervisor Jon Ola Sand also attended the meeting remotely, due to travel restrictions being placed on EBU staff until 13 March after an employee contracted the virus.

Several pre-parties – promotional events which are held across Europe in the lead up to the contest weeks – were also impacted due to the emerging pandemic. These included the PrePartyES, planned for 10–11 April in Madrid and was eventually modified to an online-only format, where artists performed at home in a YouTube concert; and three pre-parties that were cancelled: Israel Calling, a pre-party planned in Tel Aviv; Eurovision in Concert, a pre-party planned in Amsterdam; and the London Eurovision Party. The pandemic also affected pre-contest activities of several competing artists. Eden Alene, the Israeli representative, revealed that she would not travel to the Netherlands to film her postcard as a precautionary measure; the broadcaster noted they would try to find another way to film her postcard. The Lithuanian representatives The Roop also cancelled both the travel plans to film their postcard and their participation in the London and Amsterdam pre-parties. The Bulgarian representative Victoria also cancelled her participation in the London and Amsterdam pre-parties.

Ultimately, the contest itself was cancelled as a result of the pandemic and the uncertainty surrounding it, which was announced on 18 March 2020. On the same day, the EBU explained the reasons for which the alternative options that had been considered – postponement of the show, show without audience and remote show – were discarded. Postponement was impossible because at that time it was unknown when the pandemic would end and also because the winning country would not have enough time to organise the event the following year. The idea of staging a show without a live audience was also impracticable because, regardless of audience participation, the presence of production crews, delegations and relevant personnel was needed, which would constitute a breach of social distancing guidelines. Finally, a remote show was also off the table because it would have undermined the tradition and the spirit of the event, in which all contestants have an equal opportunity by performing on the same stage. By then, the Dutch government had decided to prohibit all gatherings with more than 100 attendees until further notice. The contest's Reference Group explored the option of letting the artists selected for 2020 compete in the following year instead. A decision was made on 20 March 2020 that, in accordance with the contest's rules, which disqualify songs released publicly before 1 September of the preceding calendar year, none of the 2020 songs would be eligible to compete in the 2021 contest.

The Ahoy Arena itself, with most events and gatherings in the Netherlands prohibited until at least 1 September 2020, served as a temporary care facility to cover the nationwide shortage of hospital beds. Construction of the stage would have started on 6 April.

Alternative programming

Eurovision: Europe Shine a Light 

The EBU and the host broadcasters worked on a replacement show, Eurovision: Europe Shine a Light, after the contest's cancellation. From Hilversum's Studio 21, the show was broadcast live on 16 May 2020, the date the contest's final was planned to take place, with Chantal Janzen, Jan Smit and Edsilia Rombley serving as hosts. Forty-five countries broadcast the show, including all of the countries that would have participated.

Eurovision Song Celebration 2020 
The EBU announced on 30 April 2020 that Eurovision Song Celebration 2020 would be released as a replacement for the semi-finals on the contest's official YouTube channel. The shows, presented by Janouk Kelderman and premiered on 12 and 14 May, honoured all 41 participants and their songs in a non-competitive format.

The first episode showcased the participants of the first semi-final, as well as those of host country the Netherlands and two of the "Big Five", Germany and Italy, who would also have voted in this semi-final. The second episode featured the participants of the second semi-final, as well as those of France, Spain and the United Kingdom, who would also have voted in this semi-final.

The running order was determined by the producers of the show as if the contest were actually held, while fans were asked to contribute to the show by sending videoclips of their favourite entries.

Eurovision Home Concerts 
The contest's official YouTube channel broadcast Eurovision Home Concerts every Friday from 3 April 2020, featuring planned and past artists performing their Eurovision hits, as well as one of their favourite other entries from their homes. For their cover, the act gave a shortlist of 2-4 entries for fans to choose in a poll on Twitter or Instagram, and covered the song (or songs if there was a tie) that won the poll.

EurovisionAgain 

Upon hearing about the contest's cancellation, journalist Rob Holley launched an initiative to watch a past contest on YouTube every week, eventually giving it the title EurovisionAgain. The initiative quickly became popular, so the EBU itself decided to partake. Every Saturday at 21:00 CEST, the Eurovision YouTube channel would re-broadcast a final of a previous contest, revealed by the EurovisionAgain team 15 minutes before the start. Contests prior to 2004 are available for a limited time. The initiative was generally received as a welcome distraction for fans. On Twitter, #EurovisionAgain regularly became a trending topic and received positive reactions from past participants. As part of the initiative, Holley collected over £24,700 for charity.

The season ended with a special edition where the 26 most popular songs that did not qualify for the final, one from each country, as chosen via the official Eurovision social media handles, were streamed and put to a fan-vote. Iceland's 2016 entry, "Hear Them Calling" by Greta Salóme, won the fan-vote.

National alternative programming 
Besides the Europe-wide replacement show, broadcasters were left to make plans to fill the rest of the gaps themselves. Most broadcasters provided their television audience with Eurovision-related replacement programming. Examples include holding an alternative contest by offering people the chance to listen to the 2020 entries and vote for their favourites, with some countries holding a ranking of (their own) songs throughout Eurovision history, and re-broadcasts of pre-existing Eurovision specials and previous contests which are significant for their country, such as the contest they last won.

Big Night In was organised and broadcast by the Australian broadcaster Special Broadcasting Service (SBS) and aired on 16 May 2020. Australians voted online for their favourite 2020 song (minus Montaigne's "Don't Break Me"), and over three hours, the songs was counted down from 40 to 1, with the top twenty songs being playing in full. Iceland's Daði og Gagnamagnið were crowned winners with "Think About Things".

 (English: "The Little Song Contest") was organised and broadcast by the Austrian broadcaster  (ORF). The competition consisted of three semi-finals between 14 and 18 April 2020 and a final on 18 April 2020, and was hosted by Andi Knoll. All shows were broadcast on the television channel ORF 1, as well as on the streaming platform ORF-TVthek.

 (English: "Eurovision 2020 - The German Final") was organised and broadcast by the German broadcaster  (NDR). The competition consisted of a pre-qualifying round on 9 May 2020 and a final on 16 May 2020.

Eurovision: Come Together was organised and broadcast by the British Broadcasting Corporation (BBC). Hosted by Graham Norton on 16 May 2020 and broadcast live on BBC One, an online vote determined the UK public's most popular Eurovision entry in its 64-year history, from a selection of 19 previous competing songs.

 (English: "Our 12 Points") was organised and broadcast by the Icelandic broadcaster  (RÚV).

 (English: "Eurovision Song Contest: Top 25") was a Eurovision-replacing broadcast produced by RTV SLO. The ranking of all Slovenian Eurovision entries (songs on behalf of Yugoslavia excluded), decided by over 30.000 online votes, was revealed on the show. Slovenian artists and presenters associated with Eurovision gave their opinions on the 25 songs, and interviews were held with several past Slovenian participants. During the broadcast, it was revealed that Ana Soklič, who had been selected to sing for Slovenia in Eurovision 2020, would represent her country in 2021.

 (English: "Sweden's 12 [points]") was organised and broadcast by the Swedish broadcaster  (SVT). The competition consisted of a pre-qualifying round on 9 May 2020, hosted by Christer Björkman and David Sundin, and a final on 14 May 2020, hosted by Christer Björkman and Sarah Dawn Finer. Both shows were broadcast live on SVT1, as well as on the streaming platform SVT Play. The winning entry – the hypothetical recipient of Sweden's 12 points – was the Icelandic entry "Think About Things".

Other awards

OGAE 
OGAE, an organisation of over forty Eurovision Song Contest fan clubs across Europe and beyond, conducts an annual voting poll. After all votes were cast, the top-ranked entry in the 2020 poll was Lithuania's "" by The Roop; the top five results are shown below.

Official album 

Eurovision: A Tribute to the Artists and Songs 2020 is the official compilation album of the contest, put together by the European Broadcasting Union and contains all 41 songs that would have taken part in the competition. It was originally scheduled to be released by Universal Music Group physically and digitally on 17 April 2020 but was delayed to 8 May, and later to 15 May.

Charts

See also 
 Eurovision Song Contest: The Story of Fire Saga, a film featuring a fictional Eurovision Song Contest 2020
 Eurovision Young Musicians 2020
 Junior Eurovision Song Contest 2020

Notes

References

External links 
 

 
2020
Music festivals in the Netherlands
2020 in the Netherlands
2020 song contests
Music events cancelled due to the COVID-19 pandemic
Events in Rotterdam
Music in Rotterdam